Bruce Wayne: Gothom City 1987 is the sixth studio album by Esham, released in 1997.

Track listing

Personnel
Esham (as Bruce Wayne) - performer
Zelah Williams - vocals
Mastamind - guest performer
TNT - guest performer
Moebadis - guest performer
Drunken Master - guest performer

Production
Producer: Esham
Programming: Esham

Charts
Album - Billboard (North America)

References

Albums produced by Esham
Esham albums
1997 albums
Reel Life Productions albums